High Wire may refer to:

"High Wire" (song), by Men at Work (1983)
High Wire (album), by Rob Brown (1996)

See also
Highwire (disambiguation)
Tightrope walking